RNA-binding protein Raly is a protein that in humans is encoded by the RALY gene.

In infectious mononucleosis, anti-EBNA-1 antibodies are produced which cross-react with multiple normal human proteins. The cross-reactivity is due to anti-gly/ala antibodies that cross-react with host proteins containing configurations like those in the EBNA-1 repeat. One such antigen is RALY which is a member of the heterogeneous nuclear ribonucleoprotein gene family.

References

Further reading